Wancho may refer to:

Wancho people
Wancho language
Wancho script
Wancho (Unicode block), a Unicode block containing the characters used to write the Wancho language
 wancho, a Korean word for sedge, in the traditional Korean art of creating mats, baskets and boxes called Wanchojang